The Anvik River() is a  tributary of the Yukon River in the U.S. state of Alaska. It 

The annual production of summer chum salmon along the Anvik River is thought to be the largest in the Yukon River basin. The river has excellent fishing for four species of salmon as well as northern pike, sheefish, Arctic char, rainbow trout, and grayling.

Floatplanes, riverboats, and wheeled airplanes that can land on gravel bars can transport boaters as far as McDonald Creek, near the headwaters.

See also
List of rivers of Alaska

References

Rivers of Yukon–Koyukuk Census Area, Alaska
Rivers of Alaska
Tributaries of the Yukon River
Rivers of Unorganized Borough, Alaska